Events in the year 1897 in Norway.

Incumbents
Monarch: Oscar II
Prime Minister: Francis Hagerup

Events

 The 1897 Parliamentary election takes place.

Popular culture

Sports

Music

Theathre

Literature
The play A Doll House was written by Henrik Ibsen.

Births

January to March
2 January – Olaf Ditlev-Simonsen, sailor and Olympic silver medallist (died 1978)
8 January – Theodore Theodorsen, Norwegian-American aerodynamicist (died 1978)
11 February – Jacob Christie Kielland, architect (died 1972)
17 February – Torgeir Andreas Berge, politician (died 1973)
11 March – Knut Toven, politician (died 1980)
16 March – Bernhard Berthelsen, politician (died 1964)
22 March – Ivar Heming Skre, Norwegian resistance member

April to June
17 April – Harald Sæverud, composer (died 1992)
21 April – Odd Lindbäck-Larsen, military officer and war historian (died 1975)
30 April – Johan Henrik Wiers-Jenssen, newspaper columnist and theatre director (died 1951)
1 May – Lauritz Schmidt, sailor and Olympic silver medallist (died 1970)
10 May – Harald Stenerud, hammer and discus thrower (died 1976)
15 May – Anton Olsen, rifle shooter and Olympic bronze medallist (died 1968)
17 May – Odd Hassel, physical chemist and Nobel Laureate (died 1981)
25 May – Rasmus Andreas Torset, politician (died 1965)
23 June – Trygve Knudsen, philologist, linguist and lexicographer (died 1968)

July to September
5 July – Ole H. Løvlien, politician (died 1970)
18 July – Per Gulbrandsen, rower and Olympic bronze medallist (died 1963)
22 July – Syvert Tobiassen Messel, politician (died 1978)
13 August – Oliver Dahl-Goli, politician (died 1976)
20 August –  Sigvald Asbjornsen, Norwegian-American sculptor (died 1954)
4 September – Emil Boyson, poet, author, and translator (died 1979)
5 September – Olav Benum, politician (died 1990)

October to December
4 October – Einar Diesen, newspaper editor (died 1994).
14 October – Harald Strøm, speed skater and World Champion (died 1977)
17 October – Oskar Olsen, speed skater and Olympic silver medallist (died 1956)
29 October – Ivar Bae, politician (died 1967)
31 October – Sigurd Moen, speed skater and Olympic bronze medallist (died 1967)
6 November – Sverre Riisnæs, jurist, public prosecutor and collaborator (died 1988)
13 November – Ole Jørgensen, politician (died 1966)
14 November – Bjarne Guldager, sprinter (died 1971)
11 December – Astrid Tollefsen, poet (died 1973).
24 December – Gunnar Nygaard, broadcasting pioneer (died 1997).
26 December – Ingvald Svinsås-Lo, politician (died 1980

Full date unknown
Einar Dønnum, Nazi collaborator, executed (died 1947)
Gunnar Berg, a national director of the Boy Scouts of America (died 1987)
John Gunnarsson Helland, Hardanger fiddle maker (died 1977)
Rolf Kiær, hydrographer (died 1975)
Hilmar Reksten, shipping magnate (died 1980)
Helge Thiis, architect and art critic (died 1972)
Niels Werring, shipowner (died 1990)
Hans Fredrik Wirstad, veterinarian (died 1983)

Deaths
9 March – Sondre Norheim, skier and pioneer of modern skiing (born 1825)
25 September – Hjalmar Heiberg, physician and a professor (born 1837).

Full date unknown
Hans Jensen Krog, politician (born 1808)
Christian Tønsberg, bookseller, publisher and writer (born 1813)

See also

References